The sixth season of the American police procedural television series S.W.A.T. premiered on CBS on October 7, 2022.

Cast and characters

Main 
 Shemar Moore as Sergeant II Daniel "Hondo" Harrelson Jr.
 Alex Russell as Officer III James "Jim" Street
 Kenny Johnson as Officer III+1 Dominique Luca
 David Lim as Officer III Victor Tan
 Patrick St. Esprit as Commander Robert Hicks
 Rochelle Aytes as Nichelle Carmichael
 Jay Harrington as Sergeant II David "Deacon" Kay

Recurring 
 Anna Enger Ritch as Office III Zoe Powell
 Brigitte Kali Canales as Officer III Alexis Cabrera
 Mark Labella as LEK

Guest 
 Austin Highsmith Garces as Vivian
 Christopher Goodman as Theo
 David DeSantos as Rodrigo Sanchez
 Angelica Scarlet Johnson as Kelly

Episodes

Production

Development 
On April 8, 2022, CBS renewed the series for a sixth season.

Casting 
On May 22, 2022, it was announced that Lina Esco who played Officer III Christina "Chris" Alonso for the past five seasons, would be leaving the series. The actress confirmed her departure from the series in order to pursue other job opportunities.

Release 
The sixth season of S.W.A.T. premiered on October 7, 2022. The series returned to Fridays at 8:00 p.m. leading into new series Fire Country and Blue Bloods.

Ratings

References

External links

2022 American television seasons
2023 American television seasons